Pakistan Institute of Fashion and Design, also referred as PIFD, is a public design institution primarily located in Lahore, Punjab, Pakistan. It was established in 1994 as the Pakistan School of Fashion Design (PSF) by the Trade Development Authority of Pakistan, a department within the Ministry of Federal Education and Professional Training. The close collaboration between the textile industry, Erasmus+, Commonwealth Association, business and arts communities is intended to foster multi-disciplinary education and research.

The Pakistan government, in May 2011, set out to grant the institute a degree-awarding charter enabling to provide degrees recognized by the Higher Education Commission of Pakistan.

The institute seeks to produce graduates who are able to combine design capability with manufacturing dexterity to create products that are innovative and aesthetically beautiful. PIFD trains students with the necessary management and marketing tools in order to promote these products in markets around the world. PIFD endeavors to create a new generation of designers, entrepreneurs, and highly skilled youth to cope with the demand of the new millennium through its full-time bachelor's and master's degree programs. It has consistently been ranked among the best educational institutions in Pakistan for art and design education.

The institute has 1000+ students, making it Pakistan's only design institute. PIFD is a member of the Cumulus Association, a global network of universities and colleges teaching art, design, and media.

History
With the growth of Pakistani textiles, there was a shortage of trained professionals to develop the industry. In 1994 the Trade Development Authority of Pakistan (formerly EPB) with guidance from the government of Pakistan came together with Olivier Lapidus to establish the Pakistan School of Fashion Design in rented premises at Sunder Das Road, Lahore. The Pakistan School of Fashion and Design was named "Pakistan Institute of Fashion and Design" and incorporated under Section 42 of Companies Ordinance 1984, in 2008 under the sponsorship of Ministry of Commerce, the government of Pakistan. The No Objection Certificate was issued from the Higher Education Commission (Pakistan) (HEC) for degree-awarding status in 2007.

The institute was granted the 'charter for degree-awarding status' by the National Assembly in November 2010. This is a significant milestone in the endeavor to acquire Charter status which will enable the Institute to provide an HEC recognised degree.

Schools
The institute comprises a four-year B. Des/BS. degree programme, divided into four schools:
 Faculty/School of Fashion Design 
 Faculty/School of Fashion Marketing and Promotions
 Faculty/School of Textile Design
 Faculty/School of Accessories and Products
 Department of Gems and Jewellery
 Department of Furniture Design and Manufacturing
 Department of Leather Accessories and Footwear
 Department of Ceramics and Glassware

Programme
The Foundation Year programme is a base for students before opting to pursue their major in any of the four schools (six disciplines). Students go abroad on exchange programmes and attend training and workshops in Paris; in Borås, Sweden; and at the Asian Institute of Gemological Sciences in Thailand.

The faculty portfolio consists of teachers, trained at L’Ecole Superieur Chamber Syndical de la Couture, Paris, and at affiliated schools.

Students from Punjab, Sindh, Khyber Pakhtoonkhwa, Balochistan, Azad Jammu and Kashmir, FATA and Gilgit Baltistan, and from outside of Pakistan are enrolled at PIFD. Financial assistance is available: Rs. 3.8 million were given to 91 students in 2008–2009, and in 2009–2010, Rs. 8 million in financial aid was given to 161 students.

Affiliations
The institute is affiliated with the Ecole de la Chambre Syndicale de la Couture Parisienne for Fashion Design, with the Mod' Spe' Paris for Fashion Marketing and Promotions, with the Swedish College of Textile & Sciences in Borås, Sweden since 2007 for student exchange and curriculum development; and with the Asian Institute of Gemological Sciences, Thailand for the Gems and Jewellery programme.

Local partnerships include Ministry of Commerce, Ministry of Industries, Ministry of Textile, SMEDA, PIDC, AHAN, Pakistan Gems & Jewellery Development Company (PGJDC), Pakistan Fashion Design Council (PFDC), Fashion Pakistan, Footwear Association, Furniture Pakistan, Pakistan Leather Garment Manufacturers and Exporters Association (PLGMEA), Pakistan Gloves Manufacturing Association, Ready Made Garment Association, USAID, GTZ, and Pakistan Council of Scientific and Industrial Research (PCSIR).

PIFD's collaboration with international universities and institutions:

L'Ecole de la Chambre Syndicale de la Couture, Paris, France
Mod'Spe Institute, Paris, France
Milano Fashion Institute, Milan, Italy
Moda Pelle Academy, Milan, Italy
ARS SUTORIA, Milan, Italy 
Asian Institute of Gemological Sciences, Bangkok, Thailand
University College of Boras, Sweden
Aalto University, Finland
Konstfack University, Sweden
Fashion Institute of Technology, New York
London College of Fashion, UK
Embassy of Republic of Indonesia, Islamabad
Institute of Industrial Design Co. Ltd., Poland

PIFD has been granted full membership of the Association of CUMULUS as decided by the General Assembly on 30 April 2016 in Nottingham, UK and became pioneer to have this membership in Pakistan.

PIFD's collaboration with national universities and institutions:

University of Engineering and Technology, Peshawar
Government of Punjab, PSDF Short Course Program
Lahore Chamber of Commerce and Industry (LCCI)
Pakistan Leather Competitiveness Improvement Program (PLCIP)
The Punjab Educational Endowment Fund (PEEF)
Fashion Central Media Group
Hum TV Network
Pakistan Fashion Design Council (PFDC)

Alumni
PIFD graduates are the highest paid graduates in the country and have a 100% employment ratio. They teach at Dubai, Shanghai, and Cairo fashion schools and are working in the industry as creative directors, designers, pattern makers, merchandisers, and managers. PIFD alumni serve as faculty in seven fashion schools of Pakistan.

Notable alumni
Among its notable alumni are the designers Hassan Sheheryar Yasin, Maria B, Kamiar Rokni, Nomi Ansari, Saira Shakira, Ali Xeeshan, Mohsin Ali, Akif Mahmood, Sara Rohale Asghar and Humza Bokhari.

Network
An initiative has been taken to establish six affiliated colleges, in six cities of the country, in 2011. This project is being rolled out with collaboration from the Trade Development Authority of Pakistan. 
 Islamabad College offers Fashion Design, and Gems and Jewellery studies
 Faisalabad College offers Fashion Design and Textile Design
 Peshawar College offers Gems and Jewellery, and Furniture
 Multan College offers Textile Design and Ceramics
 Quetta College offers Gems and Jewellery, and Furniture Design
 Hala College offers Ceramics

References

External links 
 PIFD website
  

Universities and colleges in Lahore
Fashion schools in Pakistan
2006 establishments in Pakistan
Educational institutions established in 2006
Ministry of Commerce (Pakistan)